Fitzhamon is a surname. Notable people with the surname include:

 Robert Fitzhamon (died 1107), Norman noble
 Mabel FitzHamon of Gloucester ( 1100–1157), Anglo-Norman noblewoman
 Lewin Fitzhamon (1869–1961), British filmmaker